The Sharp PC-1403 was a small scientific calculator and pocket computer manufactured by Sharp. It was the successor of the Sharp PC-1401, and had better display, more RAM and better system software.

Technical specifications

 CPU: Hitachi SC61860 (8-bit CMOS) 768 kHz
 Memory: 8 KB RAM (6863 bytes available), 72 KB ROM; 32 KB RAM in PC-1403H model
 Display: Monochrome LCD 1 line with 24 5×7 characters
 Power: 6 V DC - 2× CR2032, 0.03 W
 Connector (11 pins) for external devices
 Integrated speaker (4 kHz beep only)
 Contrast adjustment wheel
 Software: Simple BASIC interpreter; calculator mode
 Matrix calculations

Manufacturing started in 1986.

It is possible to convert the 1403 to a 1403H by removing the 8 K RAM and soldering in a 32 K RAM. An inverter IC is needed for this, too.

Calculator
Calculations could be performed in two modes CAL and RUN. In the former, the PC-1403 would behave like a normal scientific calculator at the time with formulas entered in algebraic logic. In RUN mode, BASIC statements could be entered for immediate execution and print out. The latter was similar to the Direct algebraic logic employed by modern calculators.

Programming
The programming model employed was unstructured BASIC for which the PC-1403 distinguished between RUN and PRO mode. The later being used to enter and edit program and the former being used to execute them.

Programming example
Here is a sample program that computes the factorial of an integer number from 0 to 69. It can be called by entering a number or an expression followed by pressing DEF F (in run mode).
 
10 "F" AREAD N                         ''allows to start the program with <expression> DEF F
20 F=1                                 ''Set start value of F to 1
30 FOR I=1 TO N                        ''counts I from 1 to N
40 F=F*I                               ''calculates F=F*I
50 NEXT I                              ''repeats loop from line 40
60 PRINT STR$ N+"!=";F                 ''print result - i.e. 5!=120.
70 END                                 ''end of program

Machine language programming
It is possible to write machine language programs into memory using the POKE command and starting them with the CALL command.

See also
 Sharp pocket computer character sets

References

PC-1403
PC-1403